Bethmännchen (German for "a little Bethmann") is a pastry made from marzipan with almond, powdered sugar, rosewater, flour and egg. It is a traditional cookie usually baked for Christmas Day and is widely available in chocolate shops around Frankfurt. 

It is a special commodity sold in Frankfurt's Christmas market, one of the oldest Christmas markets in Germany which dates back as far as 1393.

History
The name comes from the family of Bethmann. Legend has it that Parisian pastry chef Jean Jacques Gautenier developed the recipe for banker and city councilor Simon Moritz von Bethmann in 1838. Originally the Bethmännchen were decorated with four almonds, one for each son of Simon Moritz. After the death of his son Heinrich in 1845, the fourth almond was removed. However, this story is unlikely, since Simon Moritz had died already in 1826.

After one and a half centuries of manufacturing, its form and recipe has never been changed.

See also

 List of almond dishes
 List of German desserts
 List of pastries

References

External links

A recipe for Bethmännchen
Konditorei Hollhorst
Bethmannchen at Living at Home Magazine, November 2010 issue via Google Translate
Bethmannchen via Google Translate

Christmas food
Christmas in Germany
Marzipan
German pastries
Hessian cuisine